Nicholas Lane (-1644) was an English surveyor and cartographer, active in the early part of the seventeenth century, rising to prominence in his works for King Charles I.

Birth and early life
He was probably born at or near Cobham in Surrey. Contemporary accounts of his age vary considerably, but the circumstance he was apprenticed to Robert Jennings of Kingston upon Thames for seven years from May 1601  suggests a birthdate no earlier than  1585. Jennings, a fisherman, was married to Lane's sister Beatrice and, with Lane's younger brother Henry, was lessee of an eyot in the river near Kingston. Knowledge of the Thames would have been useful in some of Nicholas Lane's later assignments, but there is no evidence he fished as an occupation. In legal proceedings he described himself as “yeoman”, versed in the “art of measuring which he often practises”.

Early career
He was professionally active as a surveyor by 1613 when he mapped lands at Painshill which were the subject of a continuing dispute between Robert Bickerstaffe and James Starr, and in the following year he plotted the manor of Slyfield in Great Bookham for George Shiers, apothecary to James I. He later defended the integrity of his Slyfield measurements in Chancery proceedings, his evidence disclosing that he used the chain and plane table methods for his work and had been assisted in his survey by one William Oughtred. It is probable that this was the William Oughtred, inventor of several measuring and calculating instruments, who was rector of the nearby parish of Albury and sometimes practised as a surveyor. Cooperation with Oughtred may have contributed to the correctness and precision of Lane's work: recent assessment of one of his maps confirms “overall accuracy of over 99%”.

In the 1620s he worked for John Goode and his son, Sebastian Goode, of Malden. In 1621 he mapped land at Chessington forming part of the manor of Malden, held by John Goode from the Crown but claimed by Merton College, Oxford. Six years later, following compromise of Merton's ejectment action against the Goodes, Lane mapped the whole manor for the son. The area was the subject of a long-running dispute concerning the boundary between the College's land and the Royal estate of Nonsuch Great Park (the part that subsequently became known as Worcester Park). Lane's map of 1627 documents the outcome of litigation in the matter, which was reconfirmed by Charles I in 1633.

Later career
The social status of Lane's clients increased and in the later 1630s he was employed by the Crown in connection with the creation of both Richmond Park and Longford River. His map of the park shows the several courses he surveyed for the perimeter wall and identifies the option ultimately chosen in January 1638. In the same year he was commissioned to plan the scheme whereby water from the River Colne at Longford would be diverted to Hampton Court Palace. The channel he proposed, 19,000 metres in length with an overall fall of 8 metres, was cut in little more than nine months by Edward Manning, the same contractor who had built the Richmond Park wall. From £4,000 spent on the Longford project, Lane was allowed £5 for his work. The new river fed the fountains at Hampton Court and, later, the water features in Bushy Park. The layout of Bushy Park has also been attributed to Lane.

Also in the 1630s Lane had been active for the Crown in the Fens, and his sketches of large tracts of land between Peterborough and Wisbech survive. “Mr Lane's propositions for various works to be constructed in the fen district, co. Lincoln” were costed by Simon Hill, Director of Works in the Fens, in 1636, perhaps indicating that Nicholas Lane had previously devised water management schemes that recommended him for the Longford River assignment. By this time he was supported in his work by his son Nicholas, and in 1637 he took another of his sons, Thomas, as his apprentice. The signatures of both Nicholas senior and junior appear on a map of Putney on which they evidently collaborated in 1636/7.

A 1640 map of lands in Wonersh, commissioned by Viscount Montagu, whose Sussex estates Lane had mapped some years earlier, may be Lane's last known work.  A 1642 map of a small part of Horton in Buckinghamshire has been attributed to him but bears what looks more like the signature of his son Nicholas.

He died in 1644 and was buried at Kingston where he had lived in Wood Street and had been a churchwarden.

Legacy
Lane's surviving work provides a valuable resource for historians. For example, Lane's map of Putney, combined with the 1665 hearth tax list, has provided a key source for reconstructing a detailed view of life in the London suburb in the later seventeenth century. In 1787 it furnished information relevant to resolving the disputed boundary between Putney and Wandsworth parishes.

Maps

Lane's maps of the following are known to survive:

Lands at Painshill, Cobham, Surrey, November 1613
Lands belonging to Faversham Grammar School and Ewell House, Kent, April 1615 (held by The Faversham Society)
Oxdownes in Cobham parish, Surrey, 1618
Malden Common and Chessington Park, Surrey, 1621
Tenement at Bayhurst Hall, Little Bayhurst, and woods in Chertsey and Malden, March 1621
Enclosures in the Royal Manor of Ligham and Balham, Surrey, 1622
Manor of Beckenham, Kent, 1623
Malden parish, Surrey, 1627
Messuage called Blacknest in Keston, Kent, June 1630
Manor of West Wickham, Kent, 1632
Part of the Manor of Cryalls, Brenchley, Kent, August 1632
Manor of Dagenham and Cockrels, Delland and Mauland, Romford, Essex, April 1633
Greatworth, Northamptonshire, December 1634
Manor of Skreens of Teyhall in Roxwell, Shellow Bowells and Willingale, Essex, July 1635
Manor of Cocking, Midhurst, West Sussex, 1635
Cowdray, Easbourn Priory and Verdley, Midhurst, West Sussex, February 1635/6
Part of Putney parish, Surrey, 1637 (surveyed December 1636)
Great Common Fen and its surroundings, showing drains and dikes, near Wisbech, Cambridgeshire, 1637.
The Fens in an area between Crowland and Eye, Cambridgeshire, Lincolnshire, Northamptonshire, 1637.
Part of Laddus Fen, showing Elm Leame, Cambridgeshire, Huntingdonshire, Norfolk, 1637
Wigging Moore, Sir Oliver Cromwell's at Wigging, Abbotts Pingle and common belonging to Ramsey, Huntingdonshire, 1637
Richmond Common, Petersham Common and Mortlake Common, with parts of Roehampton, Kingston, Wimbledon and Combe, showing the extent of the “New Park” (Richmond Park), Surrey, 1637
Copyhold lands in Wonersh, Surrey, 1640

Notes

References

Bibliography

External links
 Nicholas Lane's map of Putney, 1636

English cartographers
Year of birth unknown
1644 deaths
17th-century English people
17th-century cartographers
People from Cobham, Surrey
People from Kingston upon Thames